Magnani  is an Italian-language occupational surname derived from the occupation of locksmith.

The surname Magnani was first found in Bologna (Latin: Bononia), the largest city and the capital of Emilia-Romagna Region. The early record shows that a bearer of Magnani was a government magistrate in 1223. In those ancient times only persons of rank, the podesta, clergy, city officials, army officers, artists, landowners were entered into the records. To be recorded at this time was in itself a family honor.

The Magnani family distinguished itself among the high-society of 1800' Florence and was listed in the "Golden books of Florentine nobility" commissioned initially by Ferdinando I de' Medici.

Important Palazzos in both Florence and Bologna among others still carry the name of the family.

The surname may refer to:
Anna Magnani (1908–1973), Italian actress and Academy Award winner for best actress 1956
Aurélio Magnani (1856–1921), Italian clarinetist
Dante Magnani (1917–1985), American football player
Giovanni Battista Magnani (1571–1653), Italian architect
Giulio Magnani (1505–1565), Italian Minister General of the Friars Minor Conventual and bishop of Calvi

Cesare Ricotti-Magnani (1822-1917), Italian general and minister of War of the Kingdom of Italy 
Franco Magnani (born 1938), Italian racing cyclist
Giangiacomo Magnani (born 1995), Italian footballer
Giovanni Magnani (fl. 1913), Romanian-Italian entrepreneur 
José Magnani (1913-1966), Brazilian cyclist
Lorenzo Magnani (born 1952), Italian philosopher
Marciano Magnani (born 1936), Italian wrestler
Marco Magnani (born 1969), Italian economist
Margherita Magnani (born 1987), Italian middle-distance runner
Massimo Magnani (born 1951), Italian marathon runner
Miguel Alemán Magnani, president and CEO of Mexican airline Interjet.
Primo Magnani (1892–1967), Italian cyclist, Olympic gold medalist
Roberto Magnani (born 1977), Italian footballer
Ciro Magnani (born 1992), Brazilian classical pianist

See also
Palazzo Magnani, Bologna, Italy
Palazzo Magnani Feroni, Florence, Italy
Palazzo Magnani, Reggio Emilia
Magnano

Occupational surnames
Italian-language surnames